Pablo Ervin Schmitz Simon O.F.M. Cap. (born December 3, 1943) is an American prelate of the Catholic Church who was bishop of Bluefields, Nicaragua, from 1994 to 2020.

Biography
Born in Fond du Lac, Wisconsin, United States, on December 3, 1943, Schmitz was ordained to the priesthood on September 3, 1970 for the Capuchin order. On June 22, 1984, he was appointed titular bishop of Elepla and auxiliary bishop of the Roman Catholic Vicariate Apostolic of Bluefields, Nicaragua. He was ordained bishop on September 17, 1984. 

On January 2, 1990, Schmitz was injured in an attack in Nicaragua by armed men identified as "contra" fighters that led to the deaths of two Roman Catholic nuns.

On July 28, 1994, he was appointed bishop of the Apostolic Vicariate of Bluefields. On 30 November 2017, the Apostolic Vicariate was promoted to a diocese and Schmitz was named its first diocesan bishop. He was installed there on 20 January 2018.

Pope Frances accepted his resignation on 12 November 2020.

On 9 January 2020, Pope Francis appointed him apostolic administrator of the Diocese of Siuna following the death of Bishop David Albin Zywiec Sidor. He held that post until the 26 June 2021.

References

External links

1943 births
Living people
People from Fond du Lac, Wisconsin
American Roman Catholic priests
20th-century Roman Catholic bishops in Nicaragua
Catholics from Wisconsin
Capuchin bishops
21st-century Roman Catholic bishops in Nicaragua
Roman Catholic bishops of Bluefields